The 5th constituency of Calvados is a French legislative constituency in the Calvados département. Like the other 576 French constituencies, it elects one MP using the two-round system, with a run-off if no candidate receives over 50% of the vote in the first round.

Description

It includes Bayeux, famous for its tapestry.

Deputies

Election results

2022 

 
 
 
 
 
 
 
|-
| colspan="8" bgcolor="#E9E9E9"|
|-

2017

2012 

|- style="background-color:#E9E9E9;text-align:center;"
! colspan="2" rowspan="2" style="text-align:left;" | Candidate
! rowspan="2" colspan="2" style="text-align:left;" | Party
! colspan="2" | 1st round
! colspan="2" | 2nd round
|- style="background-color:#E9E9E9;text-align:center;"
! width="75" | Votes
! width="30" | %
! width="75" | Votes
! width="30" | %
|-
| style="background-color:" |
| style="text-align:left;" | Isabelle Attard
| style="text-align:left;" | Europe Ecology – The Greens
| EELV
| 
| 21.47%
| 
| 50.71%
|-
| style="background-color:" |
| style="text-align:left;" | Cédric Nouvelot
| style="text-align:left;" | Union for a Popular Movement
| UMP
| 
| 24.02%
| 
| 49.29%
|-
| style="background-color:" |
| style="text-align:left;" | Jean-Pierre Lavisse
| style="text-align:left;" | Miscellaneous Left
| DVG
| 
| 19.48%
| colspan="2" style="text-align:left;" |
|-
| style="background-color:" |
| style="text-align:left;" | Patrick Gomont
| style="text-align:left;" | New Centre-Presidential Majority
| NCE
| 
| 15.98%
| colspan="2" style="text-align:left;" |
|-
| style="background-color:" |
| style="text-align:left;" | Philippe Chapron
| style="text-align:left;" | Front National
| FN
| 
| 11.24%
| colspan="2" style="text-align:left;" |
|-
| style="background-color:" |
| style="text-align:left;" | Mireille Brun
| style="text-align:left;" | Left Front
| FG
| 
| 3.80%
| colspan="2" style="text-align:left;" |
|-
| style="background-color:" |
| style="text-align:left;" | Anne Boissel
| style="text-align:left;" | Miscellaneous Right
| DVD
| 
| 1.96%
| colspan="2" style="text-align:left;" |
|-
| style="background-color:" |
| style="text-align:left;" | Jean-Michel Sady
| style="text-align:left;" | Ecologist
| ECO
| 
| 1.00%
| colspan="2" style="text-align:left;" |
|-
| style="background-color:" |
| style="text-align:left;" | Charline Joliveau
| style="text-align:left;" | Far Left
| EXG
| 
| 0.48%
| colspan="2" style="text-align:left;" |
|-
| style="background-color:" |
| style="text-align:left;" | Michel Moisan
| style="text-align:left;" | Far Left
| EXG
| 
| 0.45%
| colspan="2" style="text-align:left;" |
|-
| style="background-color:" |
| style="text-align:left;" | Aurélien Detey
| style="text-align:left;" | Far Left
| EXG
| 
| 0.13%
| colspan="2" style="text-align:left;" |
|-
| colspan="8" style="background-color:#E9E9E9;"|
|- style="font-weight:bold"
| colspan="4" style="text-align:left;" | Total
| 
| 100%
| 
| 100%
|-
| colspan="8" style="background-color:#E9E9E9;"|
|-
| colspan="4" style="text-align:left;" | Registered voters
| 
| style="background-color:#E9E9E9;"|
| 
| style="background-color:#E9E9E9;"|
|-
| colspan="4" style="text-align:left;" | Blank/Void ballots
| 
| 1.35%
| 
| 2.94%
|-
| colspan="4" style="text-align:left;" | Turnout
| 
| 60.50%
| 
| 60.37%
|-
| colspan="4" style="text-align:left;" | Abstentions
| 
| 39.50%
| 
| 39.63%
|-
| colspan="8" style="background-color:#E9E9E9;"|
|- style="font-weight:bold"
| colspan="6" style="text-align:left;" | Result
| colspan="2" style="background-color:" | EELV gain from UMP
|}

2007 

|- style="background-color:#E9E9E9;text-align:center;"
! colspan="2" rowspan="2" style="text-align:left;" | Candidate
! rowspan="2" colspan="2" style="text-align:left;" | Party
! colspan="2" | 1st round
! colspan="2" | 2nd round
|- style="background-color:#E9E9E9;text-align:center;"
! width="75" | Votes
! width="30" | %
! width="75" | Votes
! width="30" | %
|-
| style="background-color:" |
| style="text-align:left;" | Jean-Marc Lefranc
| style="text-align:left;" | Union for a Popular Movement
| UMP
| 
| 48.43%
| 
| 55.69%
|-
| style="background-color:" |
| style="text-align:left;" | Nathalie Le Moal
| style="text-align:left;" | Socialist Party
| PS
| 
| 25.33%
| 
| 44.31%
|-
| style="background-color:" |
| style="text-align:left;" | Christine Delecroix
| style="text-align:left;" | Democratic Movement
| MoDem
| 
| 8.50%
| colspan="2" style="text-align:left;" |
|-
| style="background-color:" |
| style="text-align:left;" | Valérie Dupont
| style="text-align:left;" | Front National
| FN
| 
| 3.39%
| colspan="2" style="text-align:left;" |
|-
| style="background-color:" |
| style="text-align:left;" | Olivier Joliton
| style="text-align:left;" | The Greens
| VEC
| 
| 3.02%
| colspan="2" style="text-align:left;" |
|-
| style="background-color:" |
| style="text-align:left;" | Paul Marie
| style="text-align:left;" | Hunting, Fishing, Nature, Traditions
| CPNT
| 
| 2.55%
| colspan="2" style="text-align:left;" |
|-
| style="background-color:" |
| style="text-align:left;" | Sylvanie Ramond
| style="text-align:left;" | Far Left
| EXG
| 
| 1.66%
| colspan="2" style="text-align:left;" |
|-
| style="background-color:" |
| style="text-align:left;" | Thierry Besnard
| style="text-align:left;" | Communist
| PCF
| 
| 1.64%
| colspan="2" style="text-align:left;" |
|-
| style="background-color:" |
| style="text-align:left;" | Stéphane Royer
| style="text-align:left;" | Far Left
| EXG
| 
| 1.43%
| colspan="2" style="text-align:left;" |
|-
| style="background-color:" |
| style="text-align:left;" | Charline Joliveau
| style="text-align:left;" | Far Left
| EXG
| 
| 0.72%
| colspan="2" style="text-align:left;" |
|-
| style="background-color:" |
| style="text-align:left;" | Caroline De Villiers
| style="text-align:left;" | Movement for France
| MPF
| 
| 0.71%
| colspan="2" style="text-align:left;" |
|-
| style="background-color:" |
| style="text-align:left;" | Alain Champain
| style="text-align:left;" | Ecologist
| ECO
| 
| 0.68%
| colspan="2" style="text-align:left;" |
|-
| style="background-color:" |
| style="text-align:left;" | France Devigne
| style="text-align:left;" | Independent
| DIV
| 
| 0.60%
| colspan="2" style="text-align:left;" |
|-
| style="background-color:" |
| style="text-align:left;" | Didier Bergar
| style="text-align:left;" | Far Left
| EXG
| 
| 0.53%
| colspan="2" style="text-align:left;" |
|-
| style="background-color:" |
| style="text-align:left;" | Micheline Dumesges
| style="text-align:left;" | Far Right
| EXD
| 
| 0.40%
| colspan="2" style="text-align:left;" |
|-
| style="background-color:" |
| style="text-align:left;" | Pascal Blanchetier
| style="text-align:left;" | Miscellaneous Left
| DVG
| 
| 0.40%
| colspan="2" style="text-align:left;" |
|-
| colspan="8" style="background-color:#E9E9E9;"|
|- style="font-weight:bold"
| colspan="4" style="text-align:left;" | Total
| 
| 100%
| 
| 100%
|-
| colspan="8" style="background-color:#E9E9E9;"|
|-
| colspan="4" style="text-align:left;" | Registered voters
| 
| style="background-color:#E9E9E9;"|
| 
| style="background-color:#E9E9E9;"|
|-
| colspan="4" style="text-align:left;" | Blank/Void ballots
| 
| 1.45%
| 
| 2.08%
|-
| colspan="4" style="text-align:left;" | Turnout
| 
| 62.53%
| 
| 61.21%
|-
| colspan="4" style="text-align:left;" | Abstentions
| 
| 37.47%
| 
| 38.79%
|-
| colspan="8" style="background-color:#E9E9E9;"|
|- style="font-weight:bold"
| colspan="6" style="text-align:left;" | Result
| colspan="2" style="background-color:" | UMP GAIN FROM UDF
|}

2002 

 
 
 
 
 
 
 
 
|-
| colspan="8" bgcolor="#E9E9E9"|
|-

1997 

 
 
 
 
 
 
 
 
|-
| colspan="8" bgcolor="#E9E9E9"|
|-

Sources
 Official results of French elections from 1998:

References

5